A hospital network is a public, non-profit or for-profit company or organization that provides  two or more hospitals and other broad healthcare facilities and services.  A hospital network may include hospitals in one or more regions within one or more states within one or more countries.  A hospital network has one headquarter, usually within one of the regions served by the network facilities.  (The term hospital system or health care system is used more broadly to define the organization of people, institutions, and resources that deliver health care services to meet the health needs of a region or country.)

History
Some of the earliest hospital networks were affiliated with charitable, religious organizations.  The Catholic Church established a hospital network in Medieval Europe that was vastly improved from the merely reciprocal hospitality of the Greeks and family-based obligations of the Romans. These hospitals were established to cater to "particular social groups marginalized by poverty, sickness, and age," according to historian of hospitals, Guenter Risse.

In the late 20th century hospital networks were established to make delivery of healthcare more efficient and to share specialized medical services and physicians across the network. To avoid financial losses due to shrinking reimbursements and rising costs as well as improving quality of care and avoid duplication of services, hospitals may consolidate certain services at one hospital.  However, patients may need to travel farther if those services are no longer offered at their local hospital.

Largest hospital networks
Hospital networks that do not have reliable sources may not be included; these are not necessarily complete lists.

Ranked by capacity 
This is a list of hospital networks with a capacity of more than 2,500 beds.

Ranked by staff 
This is a list of hospital networks with at least 20,000 staff.

By country

United States

The largest hospital networks headquartered in the United States are included in the table below.  The name, headquarters location, number of hospitals, funding type and founding year are given for each network.  There were 6,146 hospitals in the United States in 2020, of which 2,240 were managed by the largest 45 hospital networks.
  

Notes:

Canadian headquartered hospital networks
 Scarborough Health Network, Toronto, Ontario, 3 hospitals
 Sinai Health System, Toronto, Ontario, 2 hospitals
 Toronto East Health Network
 Trillium Health Partners, Toronto, Ontario, 3 hospitals
 Unity Health Toronto, Toronto, Ontario, 3 hospitals
 University Health Network, Toronto,  Ontario, 4 hospitals
 William Osler Health System, Brampton, Ontario, 2 hospitals
 Grey Bruce Health Services, Grey County, Ontario and Bruce County, Ontario, 6 hospitals
 Halton Healthcare, Greater Toronto Area, 3 hospitals
 London Health Sciences Centre, London, Ontario, 2 hospitals
 McGill University Health Centre, Montreal, Quebec, 7 hospitals

Irish headquartered hospital networks
A new grouping of hospitals was announced by the Irish Minister for Health, Dr. James Reilly TD in May 2013, as part of a restructure of Irish public hospitals and a goal of delivering better patient care:
Dublin North East (subsequently renamed RCSI Hospitals)
Dublin Midlands (subsequently renamed Dublin Midlands Hospital Group)
Dublin East (subsequently renamed Ireland East Hospital Group)
South/South West (subsequently renamed South/Southwest Hospital Group)
West/North West (subsequently renamed Saolta University Health Care Group)
Mid West (subsequently renamed UL Hospitals Group)

United Kingdom
 National Health Service (England)
 NHS Scotland
 NHS Wales
 Health and Social Care in Northern Ireland

Other
 Aga Khan Health Services, HQ in France
 Assistance Publique – Hôpitaux de Paris, Paris, France; 44 hospitals
 Chang Gung Medical Foundation, Taiwan, 8 hospitals
 Hirslanden Private Hospital Group, Switzerland, 17 hospitals

See also
 Health system
 History of hospitals

References

 
Hospitals